Saphenista ambidextria is a species of moth of the family Tortricidae. It is found in Mexico in the states of Tamaulipas and Veracruz.

References

Moths described in 1994
Saphenista